Bankmed SAL (Arabic: بنك البحر المتوسط or بنك ميد; formerly Banque de la Méditerranée S.A.L) is a Lebanese bank, established in 1944, owned by the holding company GroupMed. It is one of Lebanon’s top five banks by both assets and deposits, and has 44 branches in Lebanon, one in Cyprus, and one in Geneva (called Bankmed Suisse). Bankmed is owned by the family of Rafic Hariri, the former prime minister and billionaire businessman who was assassinated in 2005. The bank is also the largest shareholder in Solidere, the real estate company that rebuilt Beirut's Central District after the Lebanese Civil War.

In 2020, former minister Raya El Hasan was appointed as chairperson of the board after the resignation of Mohammad Hariri.

Bankmed’s total assets by 2018 were $19 billion.

Background 
Egypt-based Jordanian businessman Alaa Al Khawaja acquired the 42.24 percent stake of Ayman Hariri in GroupMed Holding which fully owns Bankmed. The other shareholders in GroupMed are Saad Hariri (42.24%) and Nazek Hariri (the remaining 15.5 percent).

Key people 

 Raya El Hasan, Chairperson of the Board
 Michel Accad, Executive General Manager
 Nazik Hariri, Board Member

See also 

 List of Banks in Lebanon
 Banque du Liban
 Bank Audi
 Byblos Bank
 Fransabank
 Economy of Lebanon

References 

Banks of Lebanon
1944 establishments in Asia